Remondini was a firm of print publishers, based in Bassano del Grappa from the mid-17th century to 1860, which was run by consecutive generations of the Remondini family:

 Giovanni Antonio (1634–1711), the founder;
 Giuseppe (1672–1742), son of the above;
 Giovanni Antonio (1700–1769) and Giambattista (1713–1773), sons of the above;
 Giuseppe (1745–1811).

References

Further reading 

 Bellini, Paolo (1995). Dizionario della stampa d'arte. Milan: Garzanti.
 Boschloo, Anton Willem (1998). The Prints of the Remondinis. Amsterdam: Amsterdam University Press.
 Fuhring, Peter (1994). "The Remondini Family [Review of Remondini: Un Editore Settecento, by M. Infelise & P. Marini]". Print Quarterly, 11(4): pp. 441–446.
 Infelise, Mario; Marini, Paola, eds. (1990). Remondini, un editore el Settecento. Milan: Electa.

Publishing companies of Italy